Fritz Wolmarans was the defending champion.

Vasek Pospisil won the title by defeating Maxime Authom 7–6(8–6), 6–4 in the final.

Seeds

Draw

Finals

Top half

Bottom half

References
 Main Draw
 Qualifying Draw

Challenger Banque Nationale de Rimouski
Challenger de Drummondville